Écoles et Lycée Français de Tananarive, or Lycée Français de Tananarive (LFT), is a French international school in Antananarivo, Madagascar. It serves levels primary school through lycée (senior high school). It serves a total of 3,000 students in four primary school campuses and one junior-senior high school campus.

Campuses
As of 2015 the junior-senior high school campus as 1,679 students. The four primary school campuses are School A , School B Ampandrianomby, School C , and School D Analamahitsy: In 2015 they had 381, 463, 247, and 191 students, respectively.

The senior high school has a boarding programme.

School D Les Charmilles is along National Route 3, in proximity to the secondary campus. School D will be at one point relocated to Ivandry.

See also
 French people in Madagascar
 List of international schools in Madagascar

References

External links
 Lycée Français de Tananarive 

Antananarivo
Antananarivo
Boarding schools